Irna Narulita is an Indonesian politician and the current regent of Pandeglang Regency. In 2017, she oversaw the regency's 143rd anniversary.

Her husband Dimyati Natakusumah had also served as the regent of Pandeglang. From 2014 to 2016, she was also a representative in the People's Representative Council.

References

1970 births
Living people
Politicians from Jakarta
United Development Party politicians
Women regents of places in Indonesia
Women members of the People's Representative Council
Mayors and regents of places in Banten
Members of the People's Representative Council, 2014
Regents of places in Indonesia